Thomas Michael Baker (born 6 July 1981, Dewsbury, Yorkshire, England) is an English cricketer, who played for Yorkshire and Northamptonshire between 2001 and 2005. Baker is a right-handed tail order batsman and right arm fast-medium bowler.

In his solitary first-class appearance, for Northamptonshire against Leicestershire at Grace Road in 2005, Baker scored a duck in his only innings, caught by Darren Maddy off Claude Henderson, and took the wicket of Darren Robinson, caught and bowled for 139, at a match cost of 55 runs.

He played four List A matches for Yorkshire in 2001, three in the Benson & Hedges Cup and one in the National League.  He also played for Northamptonshire in a one-day game against the touring Sri Lankans in 2002, and for the Northamptonshire Cricket Board against the Yorkshire Cricket Board in the preliminaries for the Cheltenham & Gloucester Trophy.  He took five wickets for 194 in these matches, with a best of 2 for 13 against Derbyshire, at an average of 38.80.

He has not appeared in senior cricket since 2005.

External links
Cricinfo Profile
Cricket Archive Statistics

1981 births
Living people
Yorkshire cricketers
Northamptonshire cricketers
English cricketers
Northamptonshire Cricket Board cricketers